The 1974 Jacksonville State Gamecocks football team represented Jacksonville State University as a member of the Gulf South Conference (GSC) during the 1974 NCAA Division II football season. Led by first-year head coach Clarkie Mayfield, the Gamecocks compiled an overall record of 7–4 with a mark of 7–1 in conference play, and finished as GSC champion.

Schedule

References

Jacksonville State
Jacksonville State Gamecocks football seasons
Gulf South Conference football champion seasons
Jacksonville State Gamecocks football